Nils Rustung Mugaas (1921–1992) was a Norwegian trade unionist and civil servant.

He chaired Statstjenestemannskartellet from 1969 to 1974 and Statens Personaldirektorat from 1974 to 1990. Statens Personaldirektorat was abolished after 1990, but was succeeded by a department in the Ministry of Government Administration and Labour led by a Government Director of Personnel.

He was born in Ullensvang. He grew up in Ostereidet, and resided in Bærum for the last 24 years of his life. Mugaas was politically active in the Labour Party.

References

1921 births
1992 deaths
People from Lindås
People from Ullensvang
Norwegian trade unionists
Directors of government agencies of Norway
Labour Party (Norway) politicians